Rockville is a town in Charleston County, South Carolina, United States, that was founded in 1784. The population was 134 at the 2010 census. Rockville is part of the Charleston-North Charleston-Summerville metropolitan area.

History
The Hanckel Mound, Horse Island, Rockville Historic District, and John Seabrook Plantation Bridge are listed on the National Register of Historic Places.

Geography
Rockville is located on Wadmalaw Island in southwestern Charleston County at  (32.602932, -80.196942), at the south end of South Carolina Highway 700, on the north bank of tidal Bohicket Creek, an arm of the North Edisto River. To the south across Bohicket Creek is the town of Seabrook Island.

Demographics

2020 census

As of the 2020 United States census, there were 141 people, 66 households, and 36 families residing in the town.

2000 census
As of the census of 2000, there were 137 people, 64 households, and 44 families residing in the town. The population density was 314.7 people per square mile (120.2/km2). There were 84 housing units at an average density of 193.0 per square mile (73.7/km2). The racial makeup of the town was 86.86% White, 11.68% African American, 1.46% from other races. Hispanic or Latino of any race were 2.19% of the population.

There were 64 households, out of which 10.9% had children under the age of 18 living with them, 62.5% were married couples living together, 6.3% had a female householder with no husband present, and 29.7% were non-families. 28.1% of all households were made up of individuals, and 10.9% had someone living alone who was 65 years of age or older. The average household size was 2.14 and the average family size was 2.60.

In the town, the population was spread out, with 10.9% under the age of 18, 8.8% from 18 to 24, 16.1% from 25 to 44, 41.6% from 45 to 64, and 22.6% who were 65 years of age or older. The median age was 52 years. For every 100 females, there were 107.6 males. For every 100 females age 18 and over, there were 100.0 males.

The median income for a household in the town was $58,977, and the median income for a family was $69,821. Males had a median income of $45,208 versus $33,750 for females. The per capita income for the town was $36,620. There were 3.9% of families and 3.1% of the population living below the poverty line, including no under eighteens and none of those over 64.

Government 
The city is run by an elected mayor–council government system.

Mayor
Riley A Bradham II

Council Members
Henry Holst, Mayor Pro Tem, Frank Thornhill, Judy Suggs, David Dunn

References

External links
Town of Rockville official website

Towns in Charleston County, South Carolina
Towns in South Carolina
Charleston–North Charleston–Summerville metropolitan area
Populated coastal places in South Carolina